Hat Check Girl is a 1932 American pre-Code comedy film directed by Sidney Lanfield and written by Barry Conners and Philip Klein. The film stars Sally Eilers, Ben Lyon, Ginger Rogers and Monroe Owsley. The film was released on October 8, 1932, by Fox Film Corporation.

Cast        
Sally Eilers as Gerry Marsh
Ben Lyon as Buster Collins
Ginger Rogers as Jessie King
Monroe Owsley as Tod Reese

References

External links
 
 

1932 films
1930s English-language films
Fox Film films
American comedy films
1932 comedy films
Films directed by Sidney Lanfield
American black-and-white films
Films scored by Arthur Lange
1930s American films
English-language comedy films